Charmaine is a Zimbabwean-Canadian rapper from Toronto, Ontario, who won the Juno Award for Rap Single of the Year at the Juno Awards of 2022 for her 2021 single "Bold".

References

21st-century Canadian rappers
Canadian women rappers
Black Canadian musicians
Rappers from Toronto
Zimbabwean emigrants to Canada
Year of birth missing (living people)
Living people
21st-century women rappers